Charles Mason (1728–1786) was a British astronomer.

Charles or Charlie Mason may also refer to:

Law and politics
Charles Mason (Iowa judge) (1804–1882), American lawyer, judge, and engineer
Charles Mason (New York judge) (1810–1879), New York judge
Charles Mason (MP) (1661–1739), Member of Parliament (MP) in the First Parliament of Great Britain
Charles A. Mason, American politician, Flint, Michigan mayor
Charles H. Mason (1830–1859), Washington Territory politician
Charles Holland Mason (1822–1894), American politician and lawyer
Charles W. Mason (1887–1969), justice of the Oklahoma Supreme Court

Sports
Charles B. Mason (1873–1935), American football coach in 1890s
Charlie Mason (1870s outfielder) (1854–1936), baseball player
Charlie Mason (footballer, born 1863) (1863–1941), English international footballer
Charlie Mason (1920s outfielder) (1894–?), American Negro leagues baseball player
Charlie Mason (ice hockey) (1912–1971), Canadian ice hockey player
Charles Mason (rower) (1908–1999), American Olympic rower
Charlie Mason (striker), footballer for Port Vale

Other
Charles Harrison Mason (1864–1961), American bishop; founder of the Church of God in Christ, 1897
Charlie Mason (EastEnders), fictional character from British soap opera EastEnders
Charlie Mason (lyricist), American lyricist
USS Charlie B. Mason (SP-1225), a United States Navy patrol vessel in commission from 1917 to 1918
Charles P. Mason (1891–1971), U.S. Navy admiral, naval aviator and mayor of Pensacola
C. Avery Mason (1904–1970), bishop of the Episcopal Diocese of Dallas